Niigaanwewidam James Sinclair, also referred to as Niigaan James Sinclair or Niigaan Sinclair, is an Anishinaabe writer, editor, and activist based in Winnipeg, Manitoba. Originally from Selkirk, Manitoba Sinclair did his BA in Education at the University of Winnipeg, an MA in Native- and African-American Literatures at the University of Oklahoma, and a PhD in First Nations and American Literatures at the University of British Columbia. Sinclair is Head of the Department of Native Studies at the University of Manitoba where he holds the Faculty of Arts Professorship in Indigenous Knowledge and Aesthetics. 

Sinclair is a co-editor of award-winning books Manitowapow: Aboriginal Writings from the Land of Water (Highwater Press, 2011), Centering Anishinaabeg Studies: Understanding the World Through Stories (Michigan State University Press, 2013). He edited and authored two chapters ("Dancing in a mall" and "the words we have inherited") in Winter We Danced: Voices of the Past, the Future, and the Idle No More Movement (Arbeiter Ring Publishing, 2014) as well as a number of graphic novels. He is also a journalist for the Winnipeg Free Press and is a former high school teacher. In addition, he is a captain with the Mama Bear Clan patrol in North Point Douglas in Winnipeg's inner city. He is the son of Senator Murray Sinclair.

Sinclair is also a public speaker and media commentator who was recently named to the “Power List” by Maclean’s magazine as one of the most influential individuals in Canada. He has helped organized Idle No More Winnipeg events and he frequently speaks on Indigenous issues on CTV, CBC and APTN. In 2018, he won Canadian columnist of the year at the National Newspaper Awards for his bi-weekly columns in The Winnipeg Free Press and is a featured member of the "Power Panel" on CBC's Power & Politics. Sinclair won the 2019 Peace Educator of the Year from the Peace and Justice Studies Association based at Georgetown University in Washington, DC. He was also previously named one of Monocle Magazine‘s “Canada’s Top 20 Most Influential People.”

Publications 
 "Dancing in a mall," and "The words we have inherited," In Winter We Danced: Voices of the Past, the Future, and the Idle No More Movement (ARP Books, 2014). ISBN 9781894037518, 1894037510.
 "Water scroll," In Tales from Moccasin Avenue: An anthology of Native Stories (Totem Poles Books, 2006). ISBN 9780973584028, 0973584025.
 "Tending to Ourselves: Hybridity and Native Literary Criticism," In Across Cultures/ Across Boarders: Canadian Aboriginal and Native American Literatures (Broadview Press, 2009). ISBN 9781551117263, 1551117266.
 "A sovereignty of transmotion: Imagination and the "real" Gerlad Vizenor, and Native literary nationalism," In Stories Through Theories/ Theories Through Stores: North American Indian Writing, Storytelling, and Critique (Michigan State University Press, 2009). ISBN 9780870138416, 0870138413.
 "Trickster Reflections: Part I," and "Trickster Reflections: Part II," In Troubling Tricksters Revisioning Critical Conversations (Wilfrid Laurier University Press, 2010). ISBN 9781554582051, 9781282534391, 9786612534393, 9781554582907, 1554582059, 1282534394, 6612534397, 1554582903.

Graphic novels 
 Redcoats-ish (Renegade Arts Entertainment, 2014). ISBN 9780992150860, 9781988903361, 0992150868, 198890336X.
 The Loxleys and Confederation (Renegades Arts Entertainment, 2015). ISBN 9780992150891, 0992150892.
 Redcoats-ish 2 (Renegade Arts Entertainment, 2018). ISBN 9781988903361, 198890336X.

Editorial contributions 
 Manitowapow: Aboriginal Writings from the Land of Water (Highwater Press, 2011). ISBN 9781553793076, 15537.
 Centering Anishinaabeg studies: Understanding the world through stories (University of Manitoba Press, 2017). ISBN 9781927849293, 1927849292.
 Impact: Colonialism in Canada (Manitoba First Nations Education Resource Centre, 2017). ISBN 9781927849293, 1927849292. 
 Indigenous nationhood: Empowering grassroots citizens (Fernwood Publishing, 2015). ISBN 9781552667958, 1552667952.

References 

Writers from Winnipeg
First Nations academics
Journalists from Manitoba
First Nations journalists
University of Winnipeg alumni
University of Oklahoma alumni
University of British Columbia alumni
21st-century Canadian male writers
People from Selkirk, Manitoba
Year of birth missing (living people)
Living people
Academic staff of the University of Manitoba
Ojibwe people
Canadian graphic novelists
Canadian schoolteachers
Indigenous studies in Canada